Dennis Henry Forsdick (2 January 1924 – 9 December 2016), was a British physician at the Friarsgate Medical Centre. In 1945, while studying medicine at Guy's Hospital, he assisted at Bergen-Belsen concentration camp as a voluntary medical student.

Publications 
 "Neonatal myasthenia gravis; report of a case". British Medical Journal, Vol. 7, No. 1 (February 1953), pp. 314–6.

See also
List of London medical students who assisted at Belsen

References

External links 
 Supplement to The London Gazette. 7 January 1949
 Private papers of Dennis Henry Forsdick Imperial War Museum
"What was the Holocaust?. Imperial War Museum

20th-century British medical doctors
London medical students who assisted at Belsen
1945 in medicine
1924 births
2016 deaths